The 2009 Notre Dame Fighting Irish football team represented the University of Notre Dame in the 2009 NCAA Division I FBS football season. The team was coached by Charlie Weis and played its home games at Notre Dame Stadium in South Bend, Indiana. Weis entered his fifth season as head coach with the expectation from the Notre Dame administration that his team would be in position to compete for a BCS Bowl berth. Notre Dame started the first part of the season 4–2, with close losses to Michigan and USC but ended the season with four straight losses, including a second loss to Navy in three years. Weis was fired as head coach the Monday after the Stanford loss at the end of the season.  Although Notre Dame was bowl eligible with 6 wins, the University announced on December 4 that the Irish had chosen not to play in a bowl game. Irish athletic director Jack Swarbrick hired Cincinnati head coach Brian Kelly after a 10-day coaching search.

Pre-season

Coaching changes
Following the 2008 season, offensive coordinator Michael Haywood left the team to become the head coach for the Miami (Ohio) University Redhawks. Following what some critics called a disappointing 7–6 season, Charlie Weis announced several major changes to the coaching staff, including the replacement of the offensive and defensive line coaches. Frank Verducci was hired to replace John Latina as the offensive line coach and was placed in charge of revamping the Irish running game as the running game coordinator. Tony Alford was hired to replace Mike Haywood as the running backs coach. Finally, Weis hired defensive line coach Randy Hart, a veteran coach at University of Washington from 1988–2008.  Former Notre Dame standout and NFL veteran Bryant Young was also hired as a defensive graduate assistant with the possibility of eventually stepping in to coach the defensive line.

Roster changes

Graduating players
Senior safety and captain David Bruton was the only player drafted from the team, going in the fourth round to the Denver Broncos as the 114th pick overall. Five more players would sign quickly after the draft, including David Grimes with Broncos, Pat Kuntz with the Colts, Terrail Lambert with the 49ers, and fullback Asaph Schwapp and offensive lineman Mike Turkovich with the Cowboys. Defensive lineman Justin Brown and captain Maurice Crum Jr. also exhausted their eligibility.

Transfers
Tight end Joseph Fauria transferred from Notre Dame to UCLA prior to the start of the season following an undisclosed University violation that would have sidelined him for the season.

Recruiting
The Irish added 18 players to its roster with high school recruits. Included in the class were five-star linebacker Manti Te'o (top defensive player in the nation), four star runningback Cierre Wood, and five-star offensive lineman Chris Watt. The class was named No. 11 by Rivals, No. 14 by ESPN and No. 23 by Scout.

Outlook

Award candidates
The following players were announced to award watch lists prior to the start of the 2009 season:

Armando Allen – Doak Walker Award
Jimmy Clausen – Davey O'Brien Award, Maxwell Award
Kyle Rudolph – Mackey Award (only sophomore named to the list)
Golden Tate – Biletnikoff Award, Maxwell Award
Dan Wenger – Rimington Trophy
Sam Young – Outland Trophy

Schedule

Roster
{| class="toccolours collapsible collapsed" style="font-size:88%;width: 100%;"
! style="padding:0;" | 
|-
|

Quarterback
 7  Jimmy Clausen – Junior – Captain
10  Dayne Crist – Sophomore
13  Evan Sharpley – Senior (5th)

Tailback
 5  Armando Allen – Junior
25  Jonas Gray – Sophomore
33  Robert Hughes – Junior
20  Cierre Wood – Freshman
32  Theo Riddick – Freshman

Fullback
34  James Aldridge – Senior
86  Bobby Burger – Senior
30  Steve Paskorz – Junior
47  Mike Narvaez(w) – Senior

X Wide Receiver
23  Golden Tate – Junior
18  Duval Kamara – Junior
1   Deion Walker – Sophomore
19  George West – Senior
11 Shaquelle Evans – Freshman

Z Wide Receiver
 3  Michael Floyd – Sophomore
82  Robby Parris – Senior
81  John Goodman – Sophomore
21  Barry Gallup Jr. – Senior
84  Robby Toma – Freshman

Tight End
 9  Kyle Rudolph – Sophomore
83  Mike Ragone – Junior
80  Tyler Eifert – Freshman
88  Jake Golic – Freshman

Left Offensive Tackle
72  Paul Duncan – Senior (5th)
70  Matt Romine – Sophomore
73  Lane Clelland – Freshman

Left Offensive Guard
59  Chris Stewart – Senior
52  Braxston Cave – Sophomore
68  Alex Bullard – Freshman

Center
55  Eric Olsen – Senior
51  Dan Wenger – Senior
57  Mike Golic, Jr. – Sophomore

Right Offensive Guard
78  Trevor Robinson – Sophomore
76  Andrew Nuss – Junior
66  Chris Watt – Freshman
65  Mike Hernandez(w) – Sophomore

Right Offensive Tackle
74  Sam Young – Senior
75  Taylor Dever – Junior
70  Zack Martin – Freshman

Left Defensive End
89  Kapron Lewis-Moore – Sophomore
53  Morrice Richardson – Senior
91  Emeka Nwankwo – Junior

Defensive Tackle
 9  Ethan Johnson – Freshman
79  Hafis Williams – Sophomore98  Sean Cwynar – SophomoreNose Tackle95  Ian Williams''' – Sophomore99  Brandon Newman – Sophomore92  Tyler Stockton – Freshman
93  Paddy Mullen – Senior

Right Defensive End
56  Kerry Neal – Junior
90  John Ryan – Senior
97  Kallen Wade – Senior

Strongside Linebacker (SAM)
45  Darius Fleming – Sophomore
41  Scott Smith – Senior (5th) – Captain
46  Steve Filer – Sophomore
48  Dan Fox – Freshman

Middle Linebacker (MIKE)
49  Toryan Smith – Senior
36  David Posluszny – Sophomore
44  Carlo Calebrese – Freshman

Weak Side Linebacker (WILL)
58  Brian Smith – Junior
 5  Manti Te'o – Freshman
54  Anthony McDonald – Sophomore

Left Cornerback
12  Robert Blanton – Sophomore
26  Jamoris Slaughter – Sophomore
 4  Gary Gray – Junior

Right Cornerback
 8  Raeshon McNeil – Senior
 2  Darrin Walls – Senior
37  Mike Anello – Senior (5th)
27  E.J. Banks – Freshman

Strong Safety
22  Harrison Smith – Junior
15  Dan McCarthy – Sophomore
 6  Ray Herring – Senior (5th)
24  Leonard Gordon – JuniorFree Safety28  Kyle McCarthy – Senior (5th) – Captain31  Sergio Brown(Nickel) – Senior
17  Zeke Motta – FreshmanLong Snapper60  Jordan Cowhart – Freshman
50  Ryan Kavanagh – SophomorePunter43  Eric Maust – Senior
35  Ben Turk – Freshman
39  Ryan Burkhart – SeniorPlace Kicker40  Nick Tausch – Freshman
14  Brandon Walker – Junior

|-
|style="border-top:1px #aaa solid" | 
Source: und.comBold denotes starter 
 Players are listed by depth and position. Not all starters have been selected.
Players who left or were dismissed from the team are struck out
|}

Coaching staff

Game summaries
Nevada

Notre Dame beat Hall of Fame coach Chris Ault's Nevada squad 35–0 to give Charlie Weis his first and only shutout as Irish head coach. Irish quarterback Jimmy Clausen continued his efficient play from the Hawai'i Bowl victory the previous season (22–26 for 401 yards and 5 touchdowns), completing 15 of 18 passes for 315 yards and four touchdowns.  Clausen started the game by completing 10 of 11 passes for 184 yards and three touchdowns, highlighted by a then career-long 70-yard pass for a touchdown to Irish wide receiver Michael Floyd.  Clausen bettered that in the third quarter with an 88-yard scoring pass to Floyd.  The 88-yard touchdown was the third longest pass completion in Notre Dame history.  Floyd leapt over Wolf Pack cornerback Doyle Miller and kept his balance when Miller tried to pull him down at the 50-yard line, then raced in for the score. Clausen also completed a 24-yard TD catch to Floyd and a 19-yard touchdown pass to tight end Kyle Rudolph in the first drive of the game. Irish running back Armando Allen logged the other touchdown on a 1-yard run.  He finished the game with 72 yards on 15 carries.

The victory was Notre Dame's first shutout victory since a 42–0 win over Rutgers in 2002.  The Irish defense set the tone early, stopping Nevada to three and out on its first three possessions. Irish linebacker Toryan Smith stuffed Wolf Pack running back Vai Taua for a 1-yard loss on fourth-and-1 and also logged a sack. Highly touted freshman linebacker Manti Te'o also got in on the action for Notre Dame on his first play early in the second quarter. On third-and-15 from the Nevada 26, Nevada quarterback Colin Kaepernick took off and had some room but Te'o caught him from behind after an 11-yard gain, forcing the Wolfpack to punt. The Irish defense held Nevada to 153 yards rushing and 307 total yards. Kaepernick was 12 of 23 passing for 149 yards with two interceptions. Irish cornerback Robert Blanton intercepted a Kaepernick pass at the end of the half, and senior captain Kyle McCarthy logged the second interception of the day and the fourth of his career in the third quarter.

Michigan

Offense ruled the day as the Fighting Irish were upset in the final seconds by archrival Michigan, 38–34.  The 72 combined points were the most in the history of the Notre Dame – Michigan rivalry, and the game marked just the fifth time Michigan has scored 30 points or more against Notre Dame.  Jimmy Clausen continued his impressive play, throwing for 336 yards and 3 touchdowns, but it was not enough to offset costly penalties (9 for 75 yards), questionable play-calling, and an efficient performance by Michigan freshman quarterback Tate Forcier (23 for 33, 240 yards, 2 TD, 1 INT).

After Daryl Stronum's 94-yard kickoff return for a touchdown helped the Wolverines to an early 14–3 lead, Notre Dame roared back in the second quarter, largely on the strength of Clausen's passing.  Clausen threw touchdowns on successive drives—the first to Golden Tate, the second to Michael Floyd—to give the Irish their first lead of the afternoon at 17–14.  The teams traded field goals at the end of the quarter and Notre Dame took a 20–17 lead to the locker room.

On the first series of the second half, Forcier led Michigan down to the Notre Dame 9-yard line before a missed field goal gave the Irish a temporary reprieve.  A Jonas Gray fumble on the ensuing Notre Dame possession was recovered by Michigan at the Irish 26-yard line, and five plays later, the Wolverines regained the lead on a 3-yard touchdown pass from Forcier to Kevin Koger.

Michigan extended its lead to 31–20 on the second play of the fourth quarter when Forcier, facing fourth-and-three, ran 31 yards for a touchdown.  Clausen rallied the Irish with a 14-play, 80-yard drive that culminated with a 21-yard touchdown pass to Golden Tate, and Kyle McCarthy intercepted Forcier on the next series, giving Notre Dame the ball at the Michigan 36.  The 7-play drive was capped by an 8-yard Armando Allen touchdown run and a successful two-point conversion run by Allen off a well-executed Statue of Liberty play, giving the Irish a 34–31 lead with a little over 5 minutes remaining.

The Notre Dame defense stiffened and forced a punt, giving the Irish offense the ball back with 3:07 remaining.  Allen rushed 13-yards to the Notre Dame 29 for a first down, but Robert Hughes was stopped on the next play for no gain and Michigan used its first timeout to stop the clock at 2:29.  Rather than run the ball and force Michigan to use its two remaining timeouts, Notre Dame head coach Charlie Weis called pass plays on second- and third-down, both of which fell incomplete, and the Irish punted the ball back to Michigan having only taken 54 seconds off the clock.  Forcier made the Irish pay for their mistake, coolly driving the Wolverines down to the Notre Dame 5-yard line, where he connected with Greg Matthews for the game-winning touchdown with 11 seconds left in the game.

With the heartbreaking loss, Notre Dame fell out of the top 25 in both the AP and Coaches' Polls.

Michigan State

Notre Dame recovered from its tough loss at Michigan by beating rival Michigan State for the first time at Notre Dame Stadium since 1993. The win wasn't sealed until Kyle McCarthy intercepted Spartans quarterback Kirk Cousins at the Irish 4-yard line with 57 seconds remaining in the game.  Trailing 30–26 midway through the fourth quarter, Jimmy Clausen connected with Golden Tate off a fly route for what proved to be a 33-yard game-winning touchdown. A key play occurred late in the third quarter when Irish defensive tackle Ian Johnson blocked a Michigan State extra point to leave the score 26–23 Notre Dame; had the extra point been successful, Michigan State could have won the game with a field goal on its final drive.

Clausen, playing through a turf toe injury, had another big game, going 22 for 31 with an even 300 yards and 2 touchdowns.  Halfback Armando Allen rushed 23 times for 115 yards and a touchdown and also threw a 5-yard touchdown pass to Robby Paris out of the wildcat formation.  The defense continued to be a problem for Notre Dame, as it surrendered 459 yards of total offense to the Spartans, including 354 through the air.

The win also proved to be costly, as Notre Dame star wide receiver Michael Floyd was lost for the several regular season games to a broken collarbone suffered during the second quarter.

Purdue

With the game on the line, Notre Dame coach Charlie Weis put the game in the hands of his hobbled quarterback Jimmy Clausen. Slowed by a turf-toe injury sustained in the Michigan State game, Clausen engineered an 88-yard game-winning drive with 3:41 to go to give Notre Dame a 24–21 victory over the Boilermakers. Trailing 21–17, Clausen completed a 22-yard pass to tight end Kyle Rudolph to move the ball to the Purdue 32. After a Purdue forced Notre Dame into a 3rd-and-14. Clausen completed a 15-yard pass to wideout Robby Parris for a first down. A 17-yarder to Golden Tate set up a first-and-goal at the 4. After three plays netted two yards, Clausen found Rudolph in the end zone on fourth down for the winner with less than a minute remaining.

Clausen played mediocre for most of the game, completing 15 of 26 passes for 171 yards, and throwing his first interception of the season. After splitting time with backup quarterback Dayne Crist, who directed two touchdown drives in the first half, Clausen returned to the game when it got tight in the fourth quarter. The victory was the Irish's third straight game decided in the final minutes. Kyle McCarthy had an interception at the 4-yard line with 57 seconds left to seal Notre Dame's 33–30 win over Michigan State the week before. A week earlier, Michigan's Tate Forcier threw a 5-yard touchdown pass with 11 seconds remaining to beat the Irish 38–34.

Washington

Notre Dame defeats the Washington Huskies 37–30 at Notre Dame Stadium to give Notre Dame its 4th win of the season. Notre Dame stayed alive with 3 goal line stands resulting in only 3 Washington Husky points. Golden Tate was able to scorch Washington's defense for 244 yards receiving, 31 yards rushing and one touchdown. Notre Dame finally wins in OT and extends their record to 8–0 against the Huskies.

USC

Notre Dame nearly caps off the incredible comeback against the trojans, but fall short and give up their 2nd loss of the season. Clausen and the Fighting Irish got off to a poor start in the 1st half, only scoring 7 points to USC's 13. USC continued their rout in the 3rd Quarter scoring 2 touchdowns and mounting a drive that would get the trojans a touchdown early in the 4th quarter, giving them a 34–14 lead over the Fighting Irish. However a surge by Notre Dame, led by Jimmy Clausen, who scored 2 4th quarter Touchdowns. 1 on the ground and 1 in the air to get the Fighting Irish within one Touchdown. Duval Kamara missed an easy touchdown catch when he tripped over the goal line, spoiling a chance for Notre Dame to tie late in the fourth quarter.  Notre Dame had the ball inside the USC 5 and appeared to score on a pass to Kyle Rudolph, but it was controversially ruled incomplete and never reviewed and ND was unable to score before the clock ran out at Notre Dame Stadium giving ND the 34–27 loss to the Trojans. Notre Dame has not beaten USC since 2001.

Boston College

Notre Dame notched its first victory vs. Boston College since 2000, outlasting the Eagles 20–16. In a game that had four lead changes, it was the Irish defense that came up big in the end, intercepting three passes by Eagles quarterback Dave Shinskie in the second half.  Notre Dame linebacker Brian Smith sealed the victory by picking off Shinskie with 98 seconds left in the game.

The Irish scored first on a 37-yard Nick Tausch field goal. Boston College would log its first points of the game on a safety resulting from an intentional grounding penalty called on Jimmy Clausen. After Nick Taush kicked a 34-yard field goal to make it 6–2, Dave Shinskie led the Eagles down the field to take the lead on a 7-yard touchdown pass to wide receiver Rich Gunnell. Jimmy Clausen and the Irish offense answered right back before the end of the first half with a 12-play, 74-yard drive culminating in an 11-yard touchdown pass from Clausen to Golden Tate. The Irish defense, however, could not maintain the lead to start the third quarter, giving up large pass plays and a 6-play, 56 yard scoring drive by the Eagles. After several stalled drives by the Irish offense, Jimmy Clausen finally connected with Golden tate on a 36-yard touchdown pass to put the Irish ahead for good with a little over eight minutes left in the game. Clausen would finish the game passing 26 for 39 with 246 yards and two touchdowns. Golden Tate logged his 5th 100+ yard receiving game, notching 128 yards on 11 catches with two touchdowns. Senior captain Kyle McCarthy also logged two of the second half interceptions to seal the Irish win.

Washington StateSource: ESPN

In the first of several "offsite home games" scheduled over the next several football seasons,  Notre Dame played host to Washington State in the Alamodome in San Antonio, Texas. The Cougars, who last played Notre Dame in 2003 losing in overtime 29–26, were routed 40–14. Notre Dame would score first with a Nick Tausch a 29-yard field goal. Notre Dame's next score came from a Jimmy Clausen pass to Duval Kamara for a 7-yard touchdown in the first quarter. In the second quarter, Golden Tate scored on a 16-yard run for a touchdown out of the wildcat formation. After a Robert Hughes touchdown put Notre Dame up 23–0, Washington State's Jeff Tuel would cut the Notre Dame lead to 23–7, connecting with Jared Karstetter for an 11-yard touchdown. Notre Dame regained momentum, however, as Clausen's second touchdown came with 7 seconds left in the half; a spectacular 50-yard hail-mary pass which Golden Tate caught in triple coverage. The play put Notre Dame up 30–7 at the half.

Notre Dame back-ups also saw game action, highlighted by backup quarterback Dayne Crist's 64-yard touchdown to John Goodman in the 4th quarter. Nick Taush also added a 23-yard field goal in the 3rd quarter, setting the Notre Dame record for consecutive field goals at 14. Clausen would finish the game 22–27, 268 yards and two touchdowns. Golden Tate would finish with 141 total yards and two touchdowns. Robert Hughes, starting in place for the injured Armando Allen, racked up 131 yards and a touchdown on 24 carries. Notre Dame's defense also stepped up, holding Washington State to 206 total yards and notching 5 sacks and two interceptions. Notre Dame would finish the game with 592 total yards in the game. Washington State freshman Jeff Tuel was 12-of-23 for 104 yards and two touchdowns and two interceptions.

Navy

Navy ends all hope for Notre Dame's BCS game goals. Navy Defense proved too much for Clausen, Tate and Weis as Navy caused 3 Notre Dame Turnovers and a 4th quarter safety to give the Midshipmen the win. Notre Dame was also unable to stop Navy's Triple Option Offense as Fullback Vince Murray ran for 158 yards with one touchdown and Quarterback Ricky Dobbs added  102 yards with one touchdown as well. Notre Dame loses to Navy for the second time in three years and the second time in a row at Notre Dame stadium. 

Pittsburgh

The Panthers cut short another incredible 4th Quarter comeback by Notre Dame at Hinz Field in Pittsburgh, PA. Johnathan Baldwin got the offense going for the Panthers, making 2 tremendous catches and Freshman Tailback Dion Lewis, who ran for over 150 yards on the Irish. Notre Dame struggled on offense in the first three quarters, only scoring 3 points. However an offense sparked by Jimmy Clausen and Golden Tate, came back down by 18 with 13 minutes left in the 4th quarter to cut the lead down to 5, 27–22, but a controversial fumble call on Jimmy Clausen at the end of the game gave the Panthers their 9th victory of the season and gave the Irish their 4th loss.

Connecticut

Senior day for the Irish is bitter once again as the Fighting Irish are downed by the Huskies of Connecticut. Connecticut staged an 11-point comeback to tie the game in regulation at 20–20 and would got onto win the game 33–30 in the game's 2nd Overtime. Charlie Weis' seat as the Notre Dame Head Coach has gotten even hotter after their loss to the Huskies and many believe this will be the last game at Notre Dame stadium coached by Weis.

Stanford

After beginning the season with high expectations of a BCS bowl berth, ND ends their season at a once again, Mediocre 6–6. Notre Dame struggled to stop Toby Gerhart, who dismantled the Irish and made his candidacy for the Heisman Trophy even more possible. Notre Dame's offense was electric, scoring 38 points despite the Cardinal owning the Irish on Time of Possession. Jimmy Clausen passed for nearly 400 yards in the loss with 5 TD's and 0 INT's. A number of things weigh in the balance after the game; Charlie Weis, Jimmy Clausen and Golden Tate's future at Notre Dame and also whether the Irish will participate in a minor post season bowl as they end the season with 6 wins and bowl eligible.

Rankings

Post-season
Charlie Weis entered this season with the expectation from the Notre Dame administration that his team would be in position to compete for a BCS Bowl berth. Notre Dame started the first part of the season 4–2, with close losses to Michigan and USC. Many of their wins were also close, aside from a 35–0 victory over Nevada and a 40–14 thrashing of Washington State. Sitting at 6–2, however, Notre Dame lost a close game at Notre Dame Stadium to an unranked Navy team, 23–21. This loss was the second to Navy in the last three years, after Notre Dame had beaten Navy forty three straight times dating back to 1963. Notre Dame Athletic Director Jack Swarbrick, when asked about what his biggest disappointment had been that season, took a long pause, then said, "the Navy outcome." While Swarbrick clarified that he would not evaluate the football season until season's end, he stated that "Up until the Navy game we were in the BCS conversation." The Navy game, however, was the first of a four-game losing skid, as Notre Dame followed up the Navy loss with losses to a top-10 Pittsburgh team, an overtime loss to Connecticut at home, and a season ending loss at Stanford. The week prior to the Stanford game, Swarbrick announced Weis would not be recruiting following the game. Weis was fired as head coach the Monday after the Stanford loss. Swarbrick announced that wide receiver coach Rob Ianello would head football operations, including recruiting, until Brian Kelly was named. Although Notre Dame was bowl eligible with 6 wins, the University announced on December 4 that the Irish had chosen not to play in a bowl game.

AwardsBiletnikoff Award'''
Golden Tate

References

Notre Dame
Notre Dame Fighting Irish football seasons
Notre Dame Fighting Irish football